Celebrity Big Brother 3 may refer to:

 Celebrity Big Brother 3 (UK), the 2005 UK series of Celebrity Big Brother
 Celebrity Big Brother 3 (U.S.), the 2022 U.S. season of Celebrity Big Brother
 Big Brother VIP 3 (Portugal), the 2013 rebooted third season of the Portuguese version of Celebrity Big Brother
 Big Brother VIP 3, the 2003 season of Big Brother VIP in Hungary
 Big Brother VIP 3, the 2004 season of Big Brother VIP in Mexico
 Bigg Boss (India): 
 Bigg Boss (Hindi season 3), the 2009 Hindi season of Bigg Boss, the Indian version of Big Brother 
 Bigg Boss Kannada 3, the 2015–2016 Kannada season of Bigg Boss, the Indian version of Big Brother
 Gran Hermano VIP 3, the 2015 VIP season of Gran Hermano, the version of Big Brother in Spain
 Grande Fratello VIP 3, the 2018 VIP season of Grande Fratello, the version of Big Brother in Italy
 HaAh HaGadol VIP 3, the 2019 VIP edition of HaAh HaGadol, the Israeli version of Big Brother
 Promi Big Brother 3, the 2015 season of Promi Big Brother, the celebrity version of Big Brother in Germany
 Veliki brat VIP 3, the 2009 celebrity season of Veliki brat, the version of Big Brother in Serbia, Bosnia and Herzegovina, Montenegro
 VIP Brother 3, the 2009 season of VIP Brother in Bulgaria

See also 

 Celebrity Big Brother
 Celebrity Big Brother 2 (disambiguation)